Above Suspicion is a 1943 American spy film directed by Richard Thorpe and starring Joan Crawford and Fred MacMurray. The screenplay was adapted from the 1941 novel Above Suspicion by Scots-American writer Helen MacInnes, which is loosely based on the experiences of MacInnes and her husband Gilbert Highet.

The plot follows two newlyweds who spy on the Nazis for the British secret service during their honeymoon in Europe.

Plot
In the spring of 1939 in England, Oxford University professor Richard Myles and his new bride Frances spend their honeymoon in continental Europe. They are commissioned by the British secret service to find a scientist who has developed a countermeasure against a new Nazi secret weapon, a magnetic sea mine. Without knowing his name, what he looks like or where to find the scientist, the couple look upon the search as an adventure and cross Europe seeking clues from clandestine contacts.

In Paris, Frances is given a hat decorated with a rose as a signal for their first contact, who silently instructs them to go to a café in Montmartre. An unseen contact plants a tourist guidebook to southern Germany in Richard's coat. The couple notice a series of ink dots on a map in the book, which, linked together, form a musical staff with the opening notes to the song "My Love Is Like a Red, Red Rose." They deduce that this is their password. Three pinpricks in the same map direct them to the book's seller, A. Werner, in Salzburg. Werner instructs them to go to a certain museum, where a man named Count Hassert Seidel, calling himself a "guide," suggests that they check into a guest house run by Frau Kleist. She provides them with a book on Franz Liszt with annotations that reveal that their next stop should be the village of Pertisau in Tyrol, where they should inquire about a doctor who collects chess pieces.

Some days later, Richard and Frances attend a performance of Liszt's music. During a passage that Thornley had been practicing earlier, a Nazi commandant is shot and killed. Officials insist on questioning each member of the audience. Richard and Frances are rescued by Gestapo chief Count Sig von Aschenhausen, a former Oxford schoolmate of Richard's. Thornley killed the Nazi colonel as revenge for the torture and murder of his Austrian fiancée.

Frances and Richard visit the home of chess collector Dr. Mespelbrunn and von Aschenhausen is there. They notice sheet music for "My Love Is Like a Red, Red Rose" on the piano. But when von Aschenhausen fails to respond to a code signal that Richard gives him, the couple become suspicious. They hear thumping noises upstairs and discover that von Aschenhausen is holding Mespelbrunn prisoner. Mespelbrunn tells them to run and that they are being hunted by the Gestapo. Frances and Richard leave the house just in time, and Count Seidel arrives to help them free Mespelbrunn. He is revealed as the missing scientist, Dr. Smith. All four head for Innsbruck, and Mespelbrunn gives Richard the plans for the countermeasure.

The couple obtain counterfeit passports from the Schultzes, an elderly couple. They are planning to catch the train to Milan at separate stations, but, when the Schultzes are arrested by the Gestapo, the police are on the lookout for the Americans. Frances is detained and questioned by the Gestapo, but Thornley, in Innsbruck to catch the same train, finds Richard. Richard, Thornley and Seidel gain entry to where Frances is being held and kill her captors, including von Aschenhausen, but Thornley is also killed. After fooling the Nazi border guards, Seidel and the American newlyweds reach freedom in Italy.

Cast

 Joan Crawford as Frances Myles
 Fred MacMurray as Richard Myles
 Conrad Veidt as Hassert Seidel
 Basil Rathbone as Sig von Aschenhausen
 Reginald Owen as Dr. Mespelbrunn
 Richard Ainley as Peter Galt
 Cecil Cunningham as Countess

 Ann Shoemaker as Aunt Ellen
 Sara Haden as Aunt Hattie
 Felix Bressart as Mr. A. Werner
 Bruce Lester as Thornley
 Johanna Hofer as Frau Kleist
 Lotte Palfi-Andor as Ottilie
 Lisa Golm as Frau Schultz
 Ludwig Stossel as Mr. Schultz
 Peter Lawford Oxford student

This film marked the end of Crawford's 18-year career with MGM before she signed with Warner Bros. It was Veidt's last role, as he died from a heart attack several weeks after shooting had ended.

Reception
Variety wrote: "Both MacMurray and Miss Crawford completely handled their roles, despite drawbacks of script material", and T.S. in The New York Times commented, "Joan Crawford...is a very convincing heroine."

Critic Howard Barnes wrote in the New York Herald Tribune: "There are so many floral, musical and cryptographical passwords in the film's plot that the whole show becomes a sort of super treasure hunt... Unfortunately, neither Joan Crawford nor Fred MacMurray looks quite bright enough to unravel the tangled skeins of this screen melodrama."

Home media
The film was released on Region 1 DVD on April 6, 2010 as part of the Warner Bros. Archive Collection.

References

External links
 
 
 
 
 Above Suspicion at Basil Rat/hbone.net

1943 films
1940s spy drama films
American spy drama films
1940s English-language films
Metro-Goldwyn-Mayer films
Films directed by Richard Thorpe
American black-and-white films
Films about Nazi Germany
Films set in Austria
Films set in Oxford
Films set in Paris
World War II films made in wartime
Films set in 1939
Films produced by Victor Saville
Films scored by Bronisław Kaper
Films based on works by Helen MacInnes
1943 drama films
American World War II films